Lihimalyao is an administrative ward in Kilwa District of Lindi Region in Tanzania. 
According to the 2012 census, the ward has a total population of 10,434. The ward seat is Lihimalyao village. Lihilmalyao ward is also the mouth of Lindi's largest and longest river, the Mbwemkuru River.

References

Wards of Kilwa District
Wards of Lindi Region